Kourou Monastiri ("Çukurova", previously ) is a Turkish Cypriot village in the Nicosia District of Cyprus, located  east of Kythrea. Kourou Monastiri is under the de facto control of Northern Cyprus. As of 2011, it had a population of 208.

References

Communities in Nicosia District
Populated places in Lefkoşa District